Yusuf Ebrahim Ahmed Qaed (born 15 July 1994) is a Bahraini tennis player.

Qaed has a career high ATP singles ranking of 1644 achieved on 3 April 2017.

Qaed represents Bahrain at the Davis Cup, where he has a W/L record of 11–33.

References

External links

1994 births
Living people
Bahraini male tennis players
Sportspeople from Manama